Eupithecia subdeverrata is a moth in the family Geometridae. It is found in Daghestan.

References

Moths described in 1975
subdeverrata
Moths of Europe